UnMerry Melodies is the first studio album by American punk rock band Bigwig. It was released on Fearless Records in 1997.

Track list

References

Bigwig (band) albums
1997 albums
Fearless Records albums